Cedar Hill Cemetery in Hartford, Connecticut is located at 453 Fairfield Avenue. It was designed by landscape architect Jacob Weidenmann (1829–1893) who also designed Hartford's Bushnell Park.  Its first sections were completed in 1866 and the first burial took place on July 17, 1866. Cedar Hill was designed as an American rural cemetery in the tradition of Mount Auburn Cemetery in Cambridge, Massachusetts.

The cemetery straddles three towns.  It was listed on the National Register of Historic Places in 1997, in Hartford, Newington, and Wethersfield.  It includes the Cedar Hill Cemetery Gateway and Chapel, also known as Northam Memorial Chapel and Gallup Memorial Gateway, which is separately listed on the NRHP.

Cedar Hill Cemetery encompasses  and includes several historic buildings, including the Northam Memorial Chapel (built 1882), which was designed by Hartford architect George Keller, and the Superintendent's Cottage (built 1875), which continues to be occupied by Cedar Hill's Superintendent to this day.

The cemetery is open from 7 a.m. until dusk every day.

Notable monuments

Cedar Hill has many unique monuments. Mark Howard was president of the National Fire Insurance Company of Hartford and Connecticut's first internal revenue collector.

Another example of an unusual grave is that of Cynthia Talcott, age two, which features her likeness in stone.

John Pierpont Morgan's family monument was designed by architect George W. Keller.  Made of red Scottish granite, the monument was designed to portray Morgan's vision of the Ark of the Covenant.

The Porter-Valentine mausoleum features a stained-glass window created by Louis Comfort Tiffany.

Notable burials

More than 30,000 people are buried at Cedar Hill Cemetery, including many notable people such as:

Robert Downing Ames (1889–1931), actor
Fern Andra (1893-1974), actress
John Moran Bailey (1904-1975), Connecticut politician
Henry Barnard (1811–1900), Connecticut educator
James Goodwin Batterson, Connecticut businessman

Charles E. Billings (1834-1920), engineer, inventor and businessman
Thomas Church Brownell, founder of Trinity College
John R. Buck, U.S. Congressman
Francis M. Bunce, U.S. Navy rear admiral
Eliphalet Adams Bulkeley, Connecticut businessman
Morgan Gardner Bulkeley, Governor of Connecticut and member of the Baseball Hall of Fame
Ernest Cady (1842-1908), 45th Lieutenant Governor of Connecticut
George Capewell, Connecticut businessman
Charles Chapman (1799-1869), U.S. Congressman
William Closson, artist
Emily Parmely Collins (1814–1909), suffragist, activist, writer
Elizabeth Jarvis Colt, Connecticut business woman
Samuel Colt, inventor of the Colt revolver
Helen Curry (1896-1931), stage actress

Katharine Seymour Day (1870–1964)
Charles Bancroft Dillingham, Broadway producer
James Dixon (1814-1873), U.S. Congressman and Senator
Virginia Dox, frontier educator and popular lecturer
Johnny Duke or Giulio Gallucci (1924–2006), professional boxer and coach
Edward Miner Gallaudet, teacher
Sophia Fowler Gallaudet, teacher
Thomas Hopkins Gallaudet, educator of the deaf
William James Glackens (1870–1938), artist
Annie Warburton Goodrich, nurse, first dean of Yale University School of Nursing

Charles Keeney Hamilton, aviator
Joseph Roswell Hawley, governor of Connecticut
Katharine Hepburn (1907–2003), actress
Katharine Houghton Hepburn (1878–1951), women's rights legal activist

Isabella Beecher Hooker (1822–1907), women's rights legal activist
Richard D. Hubbard (1818-1884), U.S. Congressman and 48th Governor of Connecticut
Richard Jarvis (1829-1903), president of Colt Firearms
Marshall Jewell (1825–1883), Connecticut businessman.
Mary Goodrich Jenson, aircraft pilot
John James McCook (1843-1927), professor and theologian
Anne Morgan (1873-1952), philanthropist
Edwin Denison Morgan (1811–1883), United States Senator
Junius Spencer Morgan, financier
John Pierpont Morgan Sr., financier
Benjamin Wistar Morris (1870–1944), architect
Peter Davis Oakley (1861-1920), US Representative
Francis Ashbury Pratt, inventor
Henry Roberts (1853–1929), Governor of Connecticut from 1905 to 1907
Thomas Henry Seymour, Governor of Connecticut
Nathaniel Shipman (1828-1906), U.S. Circuit Judge
Virginia Thrall Smith, children's rights legal advocate
Griffin Alexander Stedman, United States Civil War general of the Battle of Fort Stedman. The General Stedman monument was sculpted by John M. Moffit.
Wallace Stevens (1879–1955), poet
Julius L. Strong (1828-1872), U.S. Congressman

Allen Butler Talcott, artist
Isaac Toucey, Secretary of the Navy

Reverend Joseph Hopkins Twichell, theologian
Robert Ogden Tyler, Civil War general
Edward Sims Van Zile (1863-1931), author
Loren P. Waldo (1802-1881), U.S. Congressman
Charles Dudley Warner, writer
Jacob Weidenmann (1829–1893), Switzerland-born landscape architect
Gideon Welles (1802–1878), Secretary of the Navy under Abraham Lincoln
Horace Wells, discoverer of anesthesia
Amos Whitney, inventor
Yung Wing (1828–1912), first Chinese graduate of Yale University

Image gallery: Monuments

Image gallery: Trees

See also

National Register of Historic Places listings in Hartford, Connecticut
National Register of Historic Places listings in Hartford County, Connecticut

References

External links

 Cedar Hill Cemetery and Foundation, official website
Cedar Hill's Distinguished Heritage, official website subpage on history
 David F. Ransom, 
 Mapquest link, showing the cemetery
 

Cemeteries on the National Register of Historic Places in Connecticut
Queen Anne architecture in Connecticut
Gothic Revival architecture in Connecticut
Buildings and structures in Hartford, Connecticut
Cemeteries established in the 1860s
Cemeteries in Hartford County, Connecticut
Tourist attractions in Hartford, Connecticut
National Register of Historic Places in Hartford, Connecticut
Newington, Connecticut
Rural cemeteries
Wethersfield, Connecticut
Historic districts on the National Register of Historic Places in Connecticut
1865 establishments in Connecticut